Fajr, an Arabic word meaning "dawn", refers to the Muslim dawn prayer.

Fajr may also refer to:

Religion
 Fajr nafl prayer, a surerogatory prayer before Fajr prayer

Geography 
 Fajr, Golestan, a village in Golestan province, Iran
 Fajr, Ramian, a village in Golestan province, Iran
 Fajr, Ilam, a village in Ilam province, Iran
 Fajr Rural District (Golestan province), Iran
 Fajr Rural District (Yazd County), Yazd province, Iran
 Shahrak-e Fajr (disambiguation), places in Iran

Other uses
 Fajr International Film Festival, which is held annually in Iran
 F.C. Fajr Sepasi, an Iranian soccer team
 Fajr (satellite) Iranian satellite launched in 2015

See also
 Al-Fajr (disambiguation)
 Fajr-5, an Iranian-made artillery rocket
 Fajr-3 (disambiguation)
 Fajr-27, a domestically manufactured Iranian rapid fire cannon system
 Operation Fajr-1, 2, 3, 4, 5, 6 and 8 (Operation Dawn 1,2,3,4,5,6 and 8), Iranian Operations in the Iran–Iraq War
 Dawn (disambiguation)